William Higby (August 18, 1813 – November 27, 1887) was an American politician, a Republican, a lawyer, a District Attorney, a judge, a newspaper editor, and a United States representative from California.

Biography
Higby was born in Willsboro, New York. He spent his boyhood on his father's farm and worked in the lumber and iron business. He attended a preparatory school in Westport, New York and was graduated from the University of Vermont in Vermont in 1840, where he was a founding member of the Lambda Iota Society.  He studied law and was admitted to the bar in 1847 and commenced practice in Elizabethtown, New York.

Career
Higby moved to California in 1850 and settled in Calaveras County. After unsuccessfully attempting the mining business, he resumed the practice of law and was a district attorney from 1853 to 1859. Due to his harsh treatment of criminals, he earned the rough nickname, "Bloody Bill". He was a district judge from 1859 to 1861. Higby served in the California State Senate in 1862 and 1863.

Higby was elected as a Republican to the Thirty-eighth, Thirty-ninth, and Fortieth Congresses and served from March 4, 1863 to March 3, 1869.  During the Fortieth Congress he served as the chairman of the committee on mines and mining. He married Ellen M. Ringer,  daughter of Joseph Ringer, in 1865. He was a delegate to the Philadelphia Loyalist's Convention of 1866. He was a frequent guest at the Lincoln White House. He served as chairman of the Committee on Mines and Mining (Thirty-ninth and Fortieth Congresses). He was an unsuccessful candidate for renomination in 1868.

He served as the editor of the Calaveras Chronicle for several years. Appointed by President Ulysses S. Grant, he was also the collector of internal revenue from 1877 to 1881.

Death
Higby devoted himself to horticulture until his death. Stricken with paralysis three years before, he died in Santa Rosa, California in 1887 and is interred at Mountain View Cemetery, Oakland, California.

References

External links 

Bio Sketch
 
govtrack
History of Willsboro (Essex County) New York
Lives of the Dead: Mountain View Cemetery in Oakland

1813 births
1887 deaths
People of California in the American Civil War
Republican Party members of the United States House of Representatives from California
California state court judges
Republican Party California state senators
People from Elizabethtown, New York
People from Willsboro, New York
19th-century American politicians
19th-century American judges